In order theory, a branch of mathematics, the least fixed point (lfp or LFP, sometimes also smallest fixed point) of a function from a partially ordered set to itself is the fixed point which is less than each other fixed point, according to the order of the poset. A function need not have a least fixed point, but if it does then the least fixed point is unique.

For example, with the usual order on the real numbers, the least fixed point of the real function f(x) = x2 is x = 0 (since the only other fixed point is 1 and 0 < 1). In contrast, f(x) = x + 1 has no fixed points at all, so has no least one, and f(x) = x has infinitely many fixed points, but has no least one.

Examples
Let  be a directed graph and  be a vertex. The set of vertices accessible from  can be defined as the  least fixed-point of the function , defined as 

Let  be a context-free grammar.

Applications
Many fixed-point theorems yield algorithms for locating the least fixed point. Least fixed points often have desirable properties that arbitrary fixed points do not.

Denotational semantics

In computer science, the denotational semantics approach uses least fixed points to obtain from a given program text a corresponding mathematical function, called its semantics. To this end, an artificial mathematical object, is introduced, denoting the exceptional value "undefined".
Given e.g. the program datatype int, its mathematical counterpart is defined as 
it is made a partially ordered set by defining  for each  and letting any two different members  be uncomparable w.r.t. , see picture. 

Given some program text f, its mathematical counterpart is obtained as least fixed point of some mapping from functions to functions that can be obtained by "translating" f.
For example, the C definition 
int fact(int n) { if (n == 0) return 1; else return n * fact(n-1); }
is translated to a mapping 
 defined as  
The mapping  is defined in a non-recursive way, although fact was defined recursively.
It is possible to show that 
 

 
however, this function does not correctly reflect the behavior of the above program text for negative  e.g. the call fact(-1) will not terminate at all, let alone return 0.
Only the least fixed point,  can reasonably be used as a mathematical program semantic.

Descriptive complexity
Immerman
and Vardi
independently showed the descriptive complexity result that the polynomial-time computable properties of linearly ordered structures are definable in FO(LFP), i.e. in first-order logic with a least fixed point operator. However, FO(LFP) is too weak to express all polynomial-time properties of unordered structures (for instance that a structure has even size).

Greatest fixed points
Greatest fixed points can also be determined. In the case of the real numbers the definition is symmetric with the least fixed point, but in computer science they are less commonly used than least fixed points. Specifically, the posets found in domain theory usually do not have a greatest element, hence there may be multiple, mutually incomparable maximal fixed points, and the greatest fixed point may not exist. To address this issue, the optimal fixed point has been defined as the most-defined fixed point compatible with all other fixed points. The optimal fixed point always exists, and is the greatest fixed point if the greatest fixed point exists. The optimal fixed point allows formal study of recursive and corecursive functions that do not converge with the least fixed point. Unfortunately the optimal fixed point of an effective recursive definition may be a non-computable function so it is primarily of theoretical interest.

See also 
Knaster–Tarski theorem
Fixed-point logic

Notes

References

 Immerman, Neil.  Descriptive Complexity, 1999, Springer-Verlag.
 Libkin, Leonid. Elements of Finite Model Theory, 2004, Springer.

Order theory
Fixed points (mathematics)